Ballroom Bootcamp is an American reality television series that debuted on the TLC cable network, on October 7, 2005. The series follows several individuals who try to improve their skill of dance. The series ended on January 26, 2007, after two seasons.

Episodes

Season 1 (2005)

Season 2 (2007)

External links
 

2000s American reality television series
2005 American television series debuts
2007 American television series endings
English-language television shows
TLC (TV network) original programming
Ballroom dance